Iron County is a county in southwestern Utah, United States. As of the 2010 United States Census, the population was 46,163. Its county seat is Parowan, and the largest city is Cedar City.

The Cedar City, UT Micropolitan Statistical Area includes all of Iron County.

History
Evidence of Fremont culture habitation ranging from 750 to 1250 AD exists in present Iron County. Petroglyphs of differing periods were carved into the walls of Parowan Gap NW of Parowan. Paiutes roamed the Parowan Valley in the centuries before Euro-American exploration; their descendants are now represented by the Southern Paiute Indian Reservation, which is headquartered in Cedar City.

The Domínguez–Escalante expedition traveled through the Iron County area on October 12, 1776. Fur trapper Jedediah Smith is the first recorded Anglo-American to pass through the area (1826). Settlement of the area began in 1851, when LDS President Brigham Young directed members from the northern colonies to move into the area. A settlement, Coal Creek, sprang up in 1851; it later became Cedar City. To provide a local government structure, the State of Deseret legislature created the county on January 31, 1850, although it was not organized until January 17, 1851, with description stretching from the future Colorado, across Utah, and into the future Nevada. It was named "Little Salt Lake County" at creation, but on December 3, 1850, a legislative act changed its name to Iron County. Its borders were altered in 1850, 1852, 1854, 1856, and 1861. Also, in 1861, the federal government created the Colorado Territory, which administratively removed Iron County areas east of 109 degrees longitude.

The county borders were altered in 1862. Also, in 1862, the federal government created the Nevada Territory, which administratively removed Iron County areas west of 114 degrees longitude. Further boundary adjustments were passed in 1866, 1880, 1882, 1883, and 1884. The final adjustment was made in 1892; the county borders have remained in their current arrangement.

Geography
Iron County lies on the west edge of Utah. Its west border abuts the east border of the state of Nevada. The Iron County terrain is a study in contrast to its arid western reaches of the Escalante Desert and Great Basin ranges to the meadows and forests of the High Plateau on the east. The Markagunt Plateau is creased by the colorful formations of Cedar Breaks National Monument. Brian Head is the county's highest point, at  ASL.

Major highways

 Interstate 15
 Utah State Route 14
 Utah State Route 56
 Utah State Route 130
 Utah State Route 143
 Utah State Route 148

Adjacent counties

 Beaver County - north
 Garfield County - east
 Kane County - southeast
 Washington County - south
 Lincoln County, Nevada - west

Protected areas

 Cedar Breaks National Monument
 Dixie National Forest (part)
 Fishlake National Forest (part)
 Red Cliffs National Conservation Area (part)
 Zion National Park (part)

Lakes
Little Salt Lake
 Newcastle Reservoir
 Quichapa Lake

Demographics
As of the 2000 United States Census, there were 33,779 people, 10,627 households, and 8,076 families in the county. The population density was 10.25/sqmi (3.96/km2). There were 13,618 housing units at an average density of 4.13/sqmi (1.59/km2). The racial makeup of the county was 93.00% White, 0.35% Black or African American, 2.18% Native American, 0.74% Asian, 0.27% Pacific Islander, 1.78% from other races, and 1.67% from two or more races. 4.09% of the population were Hispanic or Latino of any race. The top 5 Ethnic groups in Iron County are:
 English: 29%
 German: 10%
 Irish: 7%
 Scottish: 5%
 Danish: 5%

There were 10,627 households, out of which 41.00% had children under the age of 18 living with them, 64.20% were married couples living together, 8.50% had a female householder with no husband present, and 24.00% were non-families. 15.90% of all households were made up of individuals, and 5.90% had someone living alone who was 65 years of age or older.  The average household size was 3.11 and the average family size was 3.45.

The county population contained 31.20% under the age of 18, 20.60% from 18 to 24, 23.60% from 25 to 44, 16.10% from 45 to 64, and 8.60% who were 65 years of age or older. The median age was 24 years. For every 100 females, there were 98.40 males. For every 100 females age 18 and over, there were 93.60 males.

The median income for a household in the county was $33,114, and the median income for a family was $37,171. Males had a median income of $30,800 versus $19,831 for females. The per capita income for the county was $13,568.  About 13.10% of families and 19.20% of the population were below the poverty line, including 20.40% of those under age 18 and 6.50% of those age 65 or over.

Recreation
 Woods Ranch Recreation Area, a recreation area located in a pine/aspen forest with hiking, fishing, picnic areas, a volleyball court and restroom facilities.
 Three Peaks Recreation Area, a recreation area made up of volcanic rock and hills. The area features rock climbing, picnics, fishing, off-road vehicle use and bike riding.
 Shooting Range
 Brian Head Ski Resort

Politics and Government
Iron County is an overwhelmingly Republican county in presidential elections, having not voted Democratic since 1936. Indeed, in no national election since the 1964 Lyndon B. Johnson landslide has the county given any Democratic presidential candidate 25 percent of its ballots.

Communities

Cities
 Cedar City
 Enoch
 Parowan (county seat)

Towns
 Brian Head
 Kanarraville
 Paragonah

Census-designated places
 Beryl Junction

 Cedar Highlands

 Modena

 Newcastle
 Summit

Unincorporated communities
 Beryl
 Buckhorn Springs
 Hamiltons Fort
 Hamlin Valley
 Lund
 Old Irontown
 State Line
 Zane

Former communities
 Gold Springs
 Iron Springs, named for the Iron Springs
 Uvada

See also

 List of counties in Utah
 National Register of Historic Places listings in Iron County, Utah

References

External links

 

 
1851 establishments in Utah Territory
Populated places established in 1851